Perrig Quéméneur (born 26 April 1984 in Landerneau) is a French former road bicycle racer from Brittany, who rode professionally between 2008 and 2019, entirely for the  team and its later iterations.

Career achievements

Major results

2006
 3rd Overall Tour du Haut-Anjou
2007
 1st Grand Prix de la ville de Buxerolles
 4th Overall Tour de Bretagne
 10th Overall Tour du Limousin
 10th Overall Tour des Pyrénées
2010
 8th Tro-Bro Léon
2011
 4th Overall Tour of South Africa
 4th Overall Tour du Gévaudan Languedoc-Roussillon
 5th Overall Rhône-Alpes Isère Tour
 7th Tour de Vendée
  Combativity award Stage 1 Tour de France
2015
  Combativity award Stage 6 Tour de France
2017
 6th Overall Rhône-Alpes Isère Tour

Grand Tour general classification results timeline

References

External links

 2014 Tour de France profile - Le Tour

1984 births
Living people
Sportspeople from Finistère
French male cyclists
Cyclists from Brittany